Virginia Moon may refer to:
"Virginia Moon", song on the Foo Fighters' album, In Your Honor
Virginia Bethel Moon (1844–1926), American spy